{{DISPLAYTITLE:C19H21N}}
The molecular formula C19H21N (molar mass: 263.38 g/mol, exact mass: 263.1674 u) may refer to:

 Nortriptyline
 Pridefine (AHR-1,118)
 Protriptyline